Souk El Khardajiya (Arabic: سوق الخرداجية) or the Scrap market is one of the souks of the Medina of Sfax.

Localization 
The souk was located in Ettaam Square also known as Ahmed Bey's Square in the western part of Nahj El Bey (or Zuqaq El Marr, the current Mongi Slim Street), near Sidi Khanfir Mosque.

Etymology 
The market got its name from its specialty, which is scrap trading.

References 

El Khardajiya